Savo Island is an island in Solomon Islands in the southwest South Pacific ocean. Administratively, Savo Island is a part of the Central Province of the Solomon Islands. The principal village is Alialia, in the north of the island.

The indigenous language of Savo is the Savosavo language, an East Papuan language. Savo Island also has a minority of Gela speakers.

The waters surrounding the island were the site of five of the seven major naval battles during the Battle of Guadalcanal in the Pacific War. As a result of these battles southeast of the island are many shipwrecks, the bay is known as Ironbottom Sound. The wrecks near the coast are very popular with wreck divers.

Geography
The highest elevation is a  stratovolcano, which last erupted between 1835 and 1847. The eruption was so strong that it wiped out all life on the island. An older eruption occurred in 1568. According to the World Organization of Volcanic Observatories (WOVO), the volcano is active every 100 to 300 years. On the island are geysers, hot mud lakes and hot springs.

The "egg fields"
Savo Island is known for the "egg fields" of the megapode, a bird which lays its eggs here and buries them in the warm sand to incubate. The eggs are excavated by local people and are considered a local food specialty. The eggs are slightly larger than a duck egg and are used for preparing omelettes and other dishes.

History

European discovery and exploration
The first recorded sighting of Savo Island by European explorers was by the Spanish expedition of Álvaro de Mendaña in April 1568. More precisely the sighting was due to a local exploration voyage done by a small boat, in the accounts the brigantine, commanded by Maestre de Campo Pedro de Ortega Valencia and having Hernán Gallego as pilot. They charted the volcanic island as Sesarga. Considering the expedition leaders Mendaña and cosmographer Pedro Sarmiento de Gamboa were both from Galicia in Spain it was probably so named after the island of the same name in this region.

On 15 March 1893 Savo Island was declared part of the British Solomon Islands protectorate. The island was occupied by the Empire of Japan in the early stages of the Pacific War.

World War II
Because of its proximity to Guadalcanal Island and the hotly contested nature of the battles for control of the Solomon Islands, Savo Island figured in many of the naval engagements of the Solomon Islands campaign.  It is most well known as the location of several naval battles fought in the adjacent "Ironbottom Sound" during World War II, between the Allied naval forces and the Imperial Japanese Navy.

List of World War II naval battles fought in the vicinity of Savo Island:
 Battle of Savo Island, 9 August 1942
 Battle of Cape Esperance (originally known as the "Second Battle of Savo Island"), 11–12 October 1942
 Naval Battle of Guadalcanal, 13–15 November 1942
 Battle of Tassafaronga, 30 November 1942

Since 1978, the island has been part of the independent state of the Solomon Islands.

See also
 List of volcanoes in the Solomon Islands
 Geography of the Solomon Islands
 History of the Solomon Islands

References

Islands of the Solomon Islands
Subduction volcanoes
Stratovolcanoes of the Solomon Islands